The Odd Fellows Hall in Portsmouth, Ohio is an Odd Fellows building.

It was built in 1871 in Italianate style.  It served historically as a meeting hall.  It was listed on the National Register of Historic Places in 1987.  The Orient Lodge No. 337, no longer owns this building and property, it is now owned by Charles Euton Real Estate.

It is a three-story building on a corner and has a projecting cornice.

It was built c.1880 by the local I.O.O.F. chapter that was formed in 1844.  It is notable as a rare surviving example in Portsmouth of an intact Italianate commercial building.  Doorways and windows on its first floor are set off by stone columns that appear to be Tuscan order, which support a plain entablature.

References

External links
HABS files
Photo of Odd Fellows Hall, at Flickr

Clubhouses on the National Register of Historic Places in Ohio
Italianate architecture in Ohio
Cultural infrastructure completed in 1871
Buildings and structures in Scioto County, Ohio
National Register of Historic Places in Scioto County, Ohio
Portsmouth
Portsmouth, Ohio
1871 establishments in Ohio